The fixture between Al-Duhail and Al Sadd is a local derby in Doha, Qatar and a fierce rivalry. The derby does not have a common name. Since the establishment of Al-Duhail, the matches between the two teams have become the most important in Qatar. The two teams have won the Qatar Stars League title 22 times, the Emir of Qatar Cup 21 times, the Qatar Cup (ex) Crown Prince Cup 11 times, and Sheikh Jassim Cup 17 times. On the continental level Al Sadd won the AFC Champions League twice and the Arab Champions League once.

History

Al-Duhail was founded in 2009 in the name of Lekhwiya who has the biggest financial budget in Qatar, and its beginning was in the Second Division, and it only lasted for one season. In his first season in the Qatar Stars League, Lekhwiya won the title to present himself as a new competitor to start a great competition with Al Sadd, which is the largest club in Qatar and the most titled. on the other side Al-Sadd was shining in the AFC Champions League where it won the title for the second time in its history. and qualifies to participate in the 2011 FIFA Club World Cup as the first Qatari club and achieved third place. In the same season Lekhwiya won the league title for the second time in a row. To continue his dominance in the Qatar Stars League for two more times, in the middle of it a championship for Al Sadd in the 2012–13 season, surpassing him. In the same season they met for the first time in the Crown Prince Cup final, which ended with Lekhwiya winning the title for the first time. On April 21, 2012, Mamadou Niang scored the first hat-trick in the history of the confrontations between the two clubs in the semi-finals of the Crown Prince Cup. In the 2014–15 season, the two clubs dominated all the local championships, where Lekhwiya won the Qatar Stars League and Crown Prince Cup, while Al Sadd won Emir of Qatar Cup and the Sheikh Jassim Cup. In the Champions League the two clubs’ journey was wonderful, as the two teams clashed in the Round of 16. Where is this considered the first time that two Qatari clubs met in Champions League that ended with Lekhwiya 4–3 on aggregate to end his career in the quarter-final against Al-Hilal.

On April 10, 2017, it was decided to merge the two clubs, Lekhwiya the champion of Qatar Stars League and El Jaish SC into one entity under the name Al-Duhail Sports Club starting from next season. On February 8, 2019, Korean Nam Tae-hee moved from Al-Duhail to Al Sadd in the first transfer deal between the two clubs, though two years later he returned to his team. After six years of waiting and almost complete control of Al-Duhail, Al Sadd won the Qatar Stars League title for the 2018–19 season, while Al-Duhail was satisfied with the runner-up and won the Emir of Qatar Cup. In the 2019 AFC Champions League, the two teams met in the Round of 16 and this time Al Sadd qualified with 4–2 on aggregate and was then eliminated in the semi-final against Al-Hilal. Under the leadership of Xavi, Al Sadd won the Qatar Stars League title for the 2020–21 season unbeaten for the 15th time in its history. On December 11, 2019, Khalifa bin Hamad bin Khalifa Al Thani son of the former Emir of Qatar, Hamad bin Khalifa Al Thani was elected president of Al-Duhail SC during the club's General Assembly meeting.

All-time head-to-head results

All-Time Top Scorers

Hat-tricks
A hat-trick is achieved when the same player scores three or more goals in one match. Listed in chronological order.

Honours

Competitions

League matches

Emir of Qatar Cup results

Qatar Cup (ex) Crown Prince Cup results

Sheikh Jassim Cup results

International results

Shared player history

Players who have played for both clubs

  Nam Tae-hee (Al-Duhail 2012–19 & 2021–present, Al Sadd 2019–21)

Qatar Stars League results

The tables list the place each team took in each of the seasons.

Notes

References

External links
 Al-Sadd - Al Duhail scores face-to-face and compositions

Lekhwiya SC
Al Sadd SC
Football rivalries in Qatar